Corema album, the Portuguese crowberry (Portuguese: camarinha; Spanish: camarina; Galician: camariña), is a species of flowering plant in the family Ericaceae endemic to the Iberian Peninsula and the Azores, where it may be considered a different species. Its white berries have been consumed by people in the Iberian Peninsula since the Islamic period. The only other species of the same genus is Corema conradii, found in North America.

Description

Male plants are more upright and female have shorter and more procumbent branches. The leaves are in whorls of three or four, with short petioles which tend to lie against the stem. Roots are thick and spreading, similar to other members of the Ericaceae.

Despite being dioecious, some plants from the southwest of the Peninsula have some hermaphrodite inflorescences paired with male inflorescences, though the fruits originated by hermaphrodite flowers have a tendency to be underdeveloped. Fruits appear in the middle of the branch as the terminal bud continues to grow. Female flowers are smaller than the male flowers. The fruits are white or pink-white, berry-like drupes,  in diameter with 2 to 9 pyrenes.

Fruits are edible and are completely white when ripe, with a strong skin. It is considered to be mildly acidic with a lemony flavour.

Corema album has its growth fase from late February to July but grow most in late spring. It flowers mostly from January to April and the fruit ripens in June–July in the south and August–September in the north and remain on the plant until October through December. It is thought to live between 25 and 35 years long.

Distribution and habitat

Corema album has two subspecies with completely different distributions.

C. album subsp. album is common in coastal sandy dunes of the Atlantic Iberia, from Galicia and the Cíes Islands in the north, along the Portuguese coast south to the Province of Cádiz, It has naturalized in France and its presence in Morocco is uncertain. It is particularly common in secondary dunes and dune valleys, where extreme communities often originate.

C. album subsp. azoricum inhabits volcanic lava and ash fields and is present on five or six of the nine islands of the Azores at usually low altitudes (below ).

There are large populations in the three large dune systems, Aspeillo in Doñana National Park in the south of Spain, from Sines to Tróia (around the Comporta coast) in south-west of Portugal, and from Nazaré to Ovar in the Costa de Prata of central-north Portugal.  Disjunct populations exist on cliffs and isolated sand dunes throughout the rest of the range.

The bush is a drought-adapted Mediterranean shrub and will tolerate low moisture levels in the soil.

Ecology

C. album subsp. album grows mainly on sand dunes, but will also inhabit rocky sites and cliffs. It occurs primarily in heathland, dwarf scrub and scrub vegetation of Halimium halimifolium, Cistus libanotis, Rosmarinus officinalis, Lavandula stoechas, Cytisus grandiflorus, Stauracanthus genistoides, Juniperus oxycedrus, Juniperus phoenicea, and is the dominant scrub in some areas along with Pinus pinea.

Conservation
In the Azores, the species is considered a priority for conservation and is one of the one hundred endangered species with priority for conservation in the Macaronesia region.

In mainland Europe the species is not considered endangered despite growing in protected dune systems (e.g. Southwest Alentejo and Vicentine Coast Natural Park and Doñana National Park).

Horticultural distribution
Corema album has been reported to grow very well near London, England and be hardy in USDA hardiness zone 8. Its natural distribution is mostly within zone 10 and a portion of Zone 9 in the Peninsula, and 11 in the Azores.

Seed germination is improved when fruits are ingested by animals. Most seeds need a dormancy period of 1–2 years but this can be avoided by keeping them moist. The plant can be propagated by cuttings.

References

Ericoideae
Flora of Portugal
Flora of Spain
Endemic flora of the Iberian Peninsula